Mateusz Sochowicz (born 28 February 1996) is a Polish luger. He competed in the men's singles event at the 2018 Winter Olympics.

Career 
Sochowicz made his Olympic debut at the 2018 Winter Olympics in Pyeongchang, South Korea.

In early November 2021, he sustained injuries while training near Beijing in preparation for the 2022 Winter Olympics. Having been given the green light, he began his training run but encountered a closed gate and found that jumping over it, as he initially hoped, would not be possible. However, he was able to somewhat reduce the impact of the crash, resulting in a fractured left kneecap and his right leg being cut to the bone. After the incident, the International Luge Federation added more safety measures.

Sochowicz returned to competition in January 2022. He was included in Poland's Olympic team.

References

External links
 

1996 births
Living people
Polish male lugers
Olympic lugers of Poland
Lugers at the 2018 Winter Olympics
Lugers at the 2022 Winter Olympics
Place of birth missing (living people)
Sportspeople from Wrocław